María Clara refers to a character in a Philippine novel.  Other uses include:

 Maria Clara gown
 Maria Clara Awards, film and television awards in the Philippines
 María Clara doctrine, a Philippine legal doctrine
 María Clara Parish Church, former national cathedral of the Philippine Independent Church, see Philippine Independent Church#María Clara Parish Church
 Maria Clara L. Lobregat Highway
 Maria Clara at Ibarra, a 2022 Philippine television series
 La Bulaqueña, a painting by John Luna sometimes called María Clara

People
 María Clara Pancha Alonso, an actress known as Clara Alonso (actress)
 Maria Clara of the Child Jesus, a Portuguese Roman Catholic professed religious who established the Franciscan Hospitaller Sisters of the Immaculate Conception in Lisbon
 Maria Clara Eimmart, a German astronomer, engraver and designer
 María Claudia Falcone, who was kidnapped during the Night of the Pencils
 Maria Clara Giai Pron, an Italian slalom canoeist 
 Maria Clara Lobregat, a Philippine politician
 Maria Clara Lobo, a Brazilian synchronised swimmer
 Maria Clara Machado, a Brazilian playwright
 María Clara Rohner, an Argentine rower

See also 
 Marie-Claire
 Head, Clara and Maria, a municipality in Canada
 Clara María Ochoa, a Colombian film producer
 Clara Maria Pope, a British painter and botanical artist
 Clara Maria of Pomerania-Barth, a member of the House of Griffins and by her two marriages Duchess of Mecklenburg-Schwerin-Ivenack and Brunswick-Dannenberg-Hitzacker